Menemerus nigeriensis is a species of jumping spider in the subfamily Salticinae. It is known from Nigeria, after which the species was named. The was described in 2011 based on a single male specimen, the holotype. The cephalothorax measures  (length×width) and the abdomen .

References

Salticidae
Spiders of Africa
Endemic fauna of Nigeria
Fauna of Nigeria
Spiders described in 2011
Taxa named by Wanda Wesołowska